Yeshiva V'Kollel Beis Moshe Chaim is an Orthodox yeshiva and a kollel located in Miami Beach, Florida. Its rosh yeshiva is Rabbi Yochanan Zweig, an alumnus of Ner Israel Rabbinical College. It is also known as the Talmudic University of Florida.

The yeshiva is located at a converted Howard Johnson located on the corner of Alton Road and 41st Street. The yeshiva building now houses the mechina, yeshiva and kollel.

External links
talmudicu.edu
cmkollel.com (archived 2019-08-19)

Orthodox yeshivas in the United States
Seminaries and theological colleges in Florida
Educational institutions established in 1974
Kollelim
Universities and colleges in Miami-Dade County, Florida
Buildings and structures in Miami Beach, Florida